Platycnemis nyansana is a species of damselfly in the family Platycnemididae. It is found in the Democratic Republic of the Congo and Uganda. Its natural habitats are subtropical or tropical moist lowland forests and freshwater marshes.

References

Platycnemididae
Insects described in 1916
Taxonomy articles created by Polbot
Taxobox binomials not recognized by IUCN